Oregon Penutian is a hypothetical language family in the Penutian language phylum comprising languages spoken at one time by several groups of Native Americans in present-day western Oregon and western Washington in the United States. Various languages in the family are divided by dialects that are in most cases identical to the various identified tribal bands in the region.

The languages were spoken largely along both banks of the lower and middle Columbia River, in the Willamette Valley, in the Oregon Cascade Range, along the Oregon Coast, and in the valleys of the Umpqua and Rogue rivers. The area in which the languages were spoken includes the most populated areas of Oregon today.

Languages in the Oregon Penutian family are:

 Kalapuyan
 Takelma
 Coast Oregon group
 Alsean
 Siuslaw
 Coosan

Recent internal classifications of Penutian, such as that of Scott DeLancey, have abandoned Oregon Penutian, while retaining the Coast Oregon Penutian family.

References

Penutian languages
Indigenous languages of the Pacific Northwest Coast
Indigenous languages of the North American Plateau
Indigenous languages of Oregon
Indigenous languages of Washington (state)